Daughter of the Jungle may refer to:
 Daughter of the Jungle (1949 film), an American adventure film
 Daughter of the Jungle (1982 film), an Italian romantic adventure film